Sunwest is a census-designated place in La Paz County, Arizona, United States. Its population was 5 as of the 2020 census.

Demographics

References

Census-designated places in La Paz County, Arizona